Prokopyevsky (masculine), Prokopyevskaya (feminine), or Prokopyevskoye (neuter) is the name of several rural localities in Russia:
Prokopyevskoye, a selo in Gostovsky Rural Okrug of Shabalinsky District of Kirov Oblast
Prokopyevskaya, Kirov Oblast, a village in Ichetovkinsky Rural Okrug of Afanasyevsky District of Kirov Oblast
Prokopyevskaya, Vologda Oblast, a village in Shebengsky Selsoviet of Tarnogsky District of Vologda Oblast